The Provincial Integration Movement  (Movimiento Integración Provincial) is a progressive political party in Ecuador. 
At the legislative elections on October 20, 2002, the party won just 1 out of 100 seats.

Political parties in Ecuador
Political parties with year of establishment missing